Devers Independent School District is a public school district based in Devers, Texas (USA).

The district has two campuses - Devers Elementary (Grades PK-5) and Devers Junior High (Grades 6-8).

Most high school students attend Liberty High in the neighboring Liberty Independent School District, while others attend Hull-Daisetta High in the Hull-Daisetta Independent School District.

In 2009 and 2010 the school district was rated "Exemplary" by the Texas Education Agency.

History
The district changed to a four day school week in fall 2019.

References

External links
 Devers ISD

School districts in Liberty County, Texas